Kyi or Kvyi is an alleged Polish god or a figure associated with smithery, mentioned only in one source, Postil of Koźmieńczyk. So far, only  has undertaken the interpretation of this figure.

Etymology 
Pan-Slavic word *kyjь (today "stick, cue, club") comes from word *kovati ("to forge") originally meaning "to beat". This noun used to mean not only "stick, club" but also "hammer" (cf. Old Church Slavonic: кꙑи/kyi "hammer", Serbo-Croatian: kij "hammer" (15th cent.), Lithuanian: kūjis "hammer"). From the word *kovati come such Polish words like kijanka "washing paddle", kuźnia "forge", kowadło "anvil", okowy "bonds", podkowa "horseshoe", kowal "blacksmith". Since 13th century Dictionary of Old Polish Personal Names notes surnames Kij, since 14th century notes surnames Kijan, Kijanowic, Kijanowski, Kijko, since 15th century notes surnames Kijski, Kijowski, Kijański, Kije, Kijk, Kijec, Kijec(s)ki. Name Kij meant "the one who beats, forges" (cf Lithuanian: káuti "to beat, forge", Old High German: houwan "to hit", Celtic cuad "to beat").

Interpretation 
Due to the fact that there is only one source listing this character and the lack of information about it in this source, possibilities for interpretation are limited. Kija could be alternation of Niya, but the fact that in the first enumeration of the Kija and Nyia are listed together speaks against this. Kyi mentioned by Koźmieńczyk may be somehow connected with the legendary Kyi – the ruler of Eastern Polans and the founder of Kyiv, mentioned in the Primary Chronicle (Długosz sees in the founder of Kyiv "one Polish pagan prince"), as well as with other characters with similar names, name donors for places with similar names to Kyiv, including hypothetically Kuyavia.

The name is associated with a certain archaic mythological complex, whose personification in Iranian mythology is Kaveh (from PIE. *kou̯ "to forge"), also known as Kobe. From a message from the 10th century B.C. Kaveh was a blacksmith-hero who killed a three-headed dragon (Aži Dahaka) and founded the Kayanian dynasty, where the title of kings from this dynasty was Key or Kay (e.g. Kay Khosrow). Like Kaveh, before the founding of Kyiv, Kyi kills the dragon. A similar motif has been preserved in the Lesser Poland (where metallurgy had existed for several hundred years) legend about Krak from the 13th century, who, according to one version, also kills the dragon. Kyi could therefore be a mythical blacksmith, a dragon slayer.

References 

Slavic gods
Smithing gods